Robert or Bob Osborn may refer to:

Sports
Bob Osborn (1903–1960), American baseball player
Bob Osborn (born 1924), coach of Cal State Fullerton Titans tennis
R. L. Osborn (Robert Lewis Osborn, born 1963), American motorcyclist

Others
Robert Osborn (Jamaica) (1800–1878), Jamaican newspaper editor and activist
Robert Osborn (satirist) (1904–1994), American cartoonist 
Robert Osborn (judge) (born 1951), Australian jurist
Robert Durie Osborn (1835–1889), India-born British army officer

See also
Robert Osborne (disambiguation)
John Robert Osborn (1899–1941), English-born Canadian VC recipient
Osborn (surname)